Dasypteroma is a monotypic moth genus in the family Geometridae. Its only species, Dasypteroma thaumasia, is found in Spain. Both the genus and species were first described by Otto Staudinger in 1892.

References

Boarmiini